Behind the Nudist Curtain is an American 1964 nudist film produced and directed by Doris Wishman and starring Sandra Sinclair.

See also
List of American films of 1964

References

External links 

1960s romance films
1964 films
1960s English-language films
Films directed by Doris Wishman
1960s American films